UKDomains was formed in 1996 and was one of the first companies within the United Kingdom to start registering Internet domain names. As the ninth registered member and TAG holder of Nominet (the .uk registry) UKDomains provides a wide range of second-level domains such as .co.uk, .org.uk and .me.uk domain names. The biggest selling second level domain in the UK supplied by Nominet is the .co.uk domain which intended for use by commercial enterprises and businesses.

In addition, UKDomains went on to supply top-level domain names which are managed by ICANN. Domains such as .com, .net and .org.

As one of the UK's largest web hosting companies it has data centre facilities in London and Farnham. Its UK headquarters are in Arena Business Centre, Holy Rood Close, Poole BH17 7BA.

Not all .uk names are provided by Nominet. Joint Academic NETwork provides ac.uk, gov.uk.

There are certain rules regarding the domain registrations with Nominet, which differ considerably between the SLDs.

Nominet has been praised for its organisation when compared with other registration authorities.

External links
Official UK domain registry
official website ICANN responsible for global coordination of domain names
public information resource

National Internet registries